Poultney is a town in Rutland County in the southwestern part of the U.S. state of Vermont. New York state is on its western border.  Castleton, Vermont, is on its northern border. Poultney was home to Green Mountain College, a private liberal arts college that closed in 2019. The Village of Poultney is entirely within the town. The town population was 3,020 at the 2020 census.

History

One of the New Hampshire Grants, Poultney was charted on September 21, 1761, by Benning Wentworth, Royal Governor of New Hampshire, and named for William Pulteney, 1st Earl of Bath, a British politician and orator.

Poultney was first settled by Thomas Ashley and Ebenezer Allen. Ashley married Zeruiah Richards, and Allen married Lydia Richards, both daughters of Zebulon Richards of Windham County, Connecticut. Ashley and Allen established themselves in a cabin near the Poultney River on February 15, 1771. Allen brought his family with him, and a son born to his wife Lydia in 1772 was the first white child born in Poultney. Ashley built a shanty and planted corn before bringing his family to Poultney—he returned with his family in the fall of 1771. Six of Ashley’s brothers followed him to Poultney during the next two years, and several members of the Richards family were also early settlers.

The town grew slowly at first because of the unresolved conflict between New York and New Hampshire over land ownership in Vermont. The Great List of Freemen in Poultney in 1781 contains the names of only 88 men. Most of the early settlers of the town came from Connecticut and Massachusetts.

All but one of the males in Poultney were supporters of the American Revolution, and most served in the army at various times during the American Revolutionary War. In 1777, Poultney was threatened with invasion by the British, and the men of Poultney left to answer the call to arms. The women and children of Poultney fled the town on July 8, 1777, in the face of Gen. John Burgoyne’s army which was advancing from the north. Most families returned to their former Massachusetts and Connecticut houses during this period of unrest. After Burgoyne’s defeat, the villagers returned to Poultney during spring of the following year.

Ebenezer Allen left Poultney in March 1783 for South Hero where he once again was the first settler in wilderness. Thomas Ashley remained in the house he built in Poultney until his death in 1810. He was a justice of the peace and a representative to the Vermont General Assembly six times between 1787 and 1801.

A grist mill was built in 1777, and the village grew up around this mill. There are many buildings of historic interest in East Poultney. Among these are the Eagle Tavern dating to 1780, the Federal style Baptist church built in 1805 by master builder Elisha Scott, and the 1823 Horace Greeley House.

East Poultney was the original home of Heman Allen, brother of Ebenezer Allen and cousin of Revolutionary War hero Ethan Allen. Horace Greeley, founder of the New York Tribune, and George Jones, co-founder of The New York Times, both lived in East Poultney in the late 1820s. Greeley served an apprenticeship at the Northern Spectator newspaper owned by Amos Bliss from 1826 to 1830. The green and nearby streets look very similar to the way they were in the 1800s.

In the last half of the 19th century slate became a major export from the region. This attracted immigrants from many countries including Wales. Lack of social mobility, experience in processing slate, and a depressed economy in Wales encouraged many Welsh slate workers to come to the Poultney region. Anecdotal evidence suggests that many of the Welsh last name in the area are pronounced using the original Welsh pronunciation. The choir at Green Mountain College is said to have the only fully Welsh repertoire in the United States.

The East Poultney Historic District and the Poultney Village Historic District are both listed in the National Register of Historic Places. Among historical buildings located there are the Union Academy dating to 1791, the Melodeon Factory built in 1840, and the 1896 Victorian school house.

Poultney shares Lake St. Catherine (about ) with the town of Wells. Poultney lies in a slate belt, where slate roofing, tiles, and building blocks are mined and milled.

Geography

Situated to the west of the Taconic Mountains, Poultney is drained by the Poultney River, a tributary of Lake Champlain.

The town is crossed by Vermont Route 30, Vermont Route 31, and Vermont Route 140. The village of Poultney is located entirely within the town.

Neighboring cities and towns

Demographics

As of the census of 2000, there were 3,633 people, 1,287 households, and 845 families residing in the town.  The population density was 82.7 people per square mile (31.9/km2).  There were 1,673 housing units at an average density of 38.1 per square mile (14.7/km2).  The racial makeup of the town was 97.16% White, 0.69% Black or African American, 0.47% Native American, 0.88% Asian, 0.25% from other races, and 0.55% from two or more races. Hispanic or Latino of any race were 0.58% of the population.

There were 1,287 households, out of which 29.2% had children under the age of 18 living with them, 52.0% were married couples living together, 9.6% had a female householder with no husband present, and 34.3% were non-families. 27.8% of all households were made up of individuals, and 12.9% had someone living alone who was 65 years of age or older.  The average household size was 2.39 and the average family size was 2.92.

In the town, the population was spread out, with 21.1% under the age of 18, 17.6% from 18 to 24, 25.0% from 25 to 44, 20.3% from 45 to 64, and 16.0% who were 65 years of age or older.  The median age was 36 years. For every 100 females, there were 96.4 males.  For every 100 females age 18 and over, there were 94.7 males.

The median income for a household in the town was $31,711, and the median income for a family was $40,556. Males had a median income of $31,148 versus $25,303 for females. The per capita income for the town was $14,963.  About 6.3% of families and 9.3% of the population were below the poverty line, including 7.7% of those under age 18 and 6.7% of those age 65 or over.

Notable people 

 Amsale Aberra, Ethiopian-born American fashion designer and entrepreneur
 Ebenezer Allen (1743–1806), soldier, pioneer, and member of the Vermont General Assembly; founder of Poultney
 Heman Allen (1779–1852), US congressman
 Jeffrey Brace (1742–1827), American Revolutionary War, Black Patriot soldier, farmer, author, and first African-American citizen of Poultney, Vermont
 Oliver Cowdery (1806–1850), leader in the Latter Day Saint movement
 William Duell, actor and singer
 Richie Grant, soccer coach
 Horace Greeley (1811–1872), newspaper editor, reformer, presidential candidate and US congressman
 Oreola Williams Haskell (1875–1953), suffrage activist, philanthropist, author, and poet
 David G. Hooker (1830–1888), mayor of Milwaukee, Wisconsin
 George Jones (1811–1891), co-founder of The New York Times
 Marcellus Jones (1830–1900), Civil War soldier
 William Miller (1782–1849), American Baptist preacher (Millerite movement)
 Edward H. Ripley, American businessman and Union Army officer in the Civil War
 William Y. W. Ripley, Union Army officer in the Civil War and recipient of the Medal of Honor
 George E. Royce, American businessman and banker
 Ethan Smith (1762–1849), Congregationalist clergyman and author of View of the Hebrews
 John E. Woodward (1870–1944), U.S. Army brigadier general

References

External links

 Town of Poultney official website
 Poultney Chamber of Commerce
 Poultney Public Library
 Green Mountain College
 Horace Greeley Foundation
 Poultney Snow Devils Snowmobile Club

Towns in Vermont
 
Towns in Rutland County, Vermont